Kalaw is a hill town  in the Shan State of Myanmar. It is located in Kalaw Township in Taunggyi District.

Overview
The town was popular with the British during colonial rule. Kalaw is the main setting of the novel Das Herzenhören by Jan-Philipp Sendker.

The hill station is located at an elevation of 1310 metres, 50 km from the Inle lake. Kalaw is famous for hiking and trekking. Many trekking trails ranging from nearby places to Inle Lake and Pindaya. The town still feels like a high-altitude holiday resort – the air is cool, the atmosphere is calm and the tree-lined streets still contain a smattering of colonial-era architecture – while the surrounding hills are fine for relatively easy day or overnight treks to Danu, Danaw, Palaung, Pa-O and Taung Yo villages.

Notable residents
 Smith Dun

References

External links

Satellite map at Maplandia.com

Township capitals of Myanmar
Hill stations in Myanmar
Populated places in Taunggyi District
Kalaw Township